Władysław Lisewski (11 April 1948 – 5 July 2021) was a Polish politician. He served as Mayor of Szczecin and Voivode of Szczecin Voivodeship and West Pomeranian Voivodeship.

Biography
Lisewski earned degrees in mechanical engineering and shipbuilding from the Szczecin University of Technology and a degree in mathematics from the Adam Mickiewicz University in Poznań. In 1980, he joined Solidarity. From 1991 to 1997, he was a member of the Centre Agreement and subsequently Solidarity Electoral Action until 2001.

Eleven days later, he was fully installed as Mayor by city councilors and held the office until 5 July 1994. After three years of running his own business, he became the last Voivode of Szczecin Voivodeship.

Władysław Lisewski died on 5 July 2021 at the age of 73.

Decorations
Order of Polonia Restituta (2018)
Cross of Freedom and Solidarity (2018)

References

1948 births
2021 deaths
Polish politicians
Solidarity (Polish trade union) activists
Solidarity Electoral Action politicians
Centre Agreement politicians
Mayors of places in Poland
Szczecin University of Technology alumni
Adam Mickiewicz University in Poznań alumni
Politicians from Szczecin
People from Golub-Dobrzyń County
Recipients of the Order of Polonia Restituta
Recipients of Cross of Freedom and Solidarity
Mayors of Szczecin